The Bar-Rakib inscriptions are a group of 8th-century BC steles, or fragments of steles, of King Bar-Rakib, from Sam'al. 

The inscriptions were discovered during the 1888–1911 German Oriental Society expeditions led by Felix von Luschan and Robert Koldewey.

Their Aramaic inscriptions are written in Luwian-style raised characters, and represent some of the first known inscriptions to use Imperial Aramaic. Older inscriptions found at Sam'al were written in the "Samalian language" or the Phoenician language.

Table

Gallery

References

Bibliography
 Halévy, J., "La première inscription araméenne de Barrekoub ou A1." RevSém 3 (1895b): 394–95.
 Müller, D.H., "Die Bauinschrift des Barrekub." WZKM 10 (1896): 193–97 + 1 pl.. 
 Winckler, H., "Die Bauinschrift Bar-rekub's aus Sendschirli." MVAG 1 (1896): 198–202.
 Halévy, J., "La première inscription de Bar-Rekoub revue et corrigée." RevSém 4 (1896a): 185–87.
 Hoffmann, G., "Zur Bauinschrift des Barrekab." ZA 11 (1896a): 317–22.
 Halévy, J., "Le texte définitif de l'inscription architecturale araméenne de Barrekoub." RevSém 5 (1897): 84–91.
 Peiser, F.E., "Aus dem kaiserlich-ottomanischen Museum in Constantinopel." OLZ 1 (1898): 6–9.
 Halévy, J., "Nouvel examen des inscriptions de Zindjirli." RevSém 7 (1899): 333–55
 Halévy, J., "Un bas-relief à  inscription araméenne de Barrekoub." RevSém 3 (1895a): 392–94
 Müller, D.H., "Die Bauinschrift des Barrekub." WZKM 10 (1896): 193–97 + 1 pl.
 Luschan, F. von, "Bildwerke und Inschriften." Pp. 325–80 In Ausgrabungen in Sendschirli, IV. , Berlin: G. Reimer, 1911
 Halévy, J., "Les deux inscriptions hétéennes de Zindjîrlî." RevSém 1 (1893-94): 138–67, 218-58, 319-36; 2:25-60
 Sachau, E., "Baal-Harrân in einer altaramäischen Inschrift auf einem Relief des Königlichen Museums zu Berlin." SPAW 8 (1895): 119–22

Aramean kings
Ancient Near East steles
Aramaic inscriptions
KAI inscriptions
8th-century BC steles